The Sweden women's national artistic gymnastics team represents Sweden in FIG international competitions.

History
Sweden made their Olympic debut in 1948, in which they placed 4th as a team.  At the 1952 Olympic Games they won gold in the Team Portable Apparatus.

Team competition results

Olympic Games
 1948 — 4th place
Karin Lindberg, Kerstin Bohman, Ingrid Sandahl, Göta Pettersson, Gunnel Johansson, Märta Andersson, Ingrid Andersson, Stina Haage
 1952 — 4th place
Karin Lindberg, Gun Röring, Evy Berggren, Göta Pettersson, Ann-Sofi Pettersson-Colling, Ingrid Sandahl, Hjördis Nordin, Vanja Blomberg
 1956 — 8th place
Evy Berggren, Doris Hedberg, Maude Karlén, Karin Lindberg, Ann-Sofi Pettersson-Colling, Eva Rönström
 1960 — 11th place
Lena Adler, Solveig Egman-Andersson, Monica Elfvin, Gerola Lindahl, Ulla Lindström, Ewa Rydell
 1964 — 8th place
Marie Lundqvist-Björk, Solveig Egman-Andersson, Ewa Rydell, Ulla Lindström, Anne-Marie Lambert, Gerola Lindahl

World Championships
 1950 –  gold medal
Evy Berggren, Vanja Blomberg, Karin Lindberg, Gunnel Ljungström, Hjördis Nordin, Ann-Sofi Pettersson, Göta Pettersson, Ingrid Sandahl
 1954 – 8th place
 1958 – 11th place
 1962 – 10th place
 1966 – 9th place
 2022 – 18th place (qualifications)
 Alva Eriksson, Malva Lundqvist Wingren, Tonya Paulsson, Emelie Westlund, Nathalie Westlund

Senior roster

Most decorated gymnasts
This list includes all Swedish female artistic gymnasts who have won a medal at the Olympic Games or the World Artistic Gymnastics Championships.  Medals won in the Team Portable Apparatus at the 1952 or 1956 Olympic Games are located under the Team column and are designated with an asterisk (*).

References

Gymnastics in Sweden
National women's artistic gymnastics teams
Gymnastics